The 2013 NACRA Rugby Championship is a rugby union championship for Tier 3 North American and Caribbean teams, and took place between January and June, 2013.

The top four teams from the second round of 2012 NACRA Championship qualified for the second round of the 2013 championship, while the third place team from the north and south pools of the 2012 championship qualified for the final games of the first round.

The championship is split between north and south, with the winner of each division playing in a final game.

This was the first game in the NACRA Championship for Curaçao and Turks and Caicos Islands.

Round 1

Round 1a - North

Winner qualifies for Round 1b - North

Semi-finals

Final

Round 1a - South

Winner qualifies for Round 1b - South

Semi-final

Final

Round 1b - North
The Bahamas hosted a game against the winner of Round 1a - North (USA South).  The winner  progressed to Round 2 - North to take on Bermuda and Cayman Islands.

Round 1b - South
Barbados hosted game against the winner of Round 1a - South (Curaçao).  The winner progressed to Round 2 - South to take on Guyana and Trinidad & Tobago.

Round 2
Round 2 was played in regional single round robin (2 games for each team).  The top team from the North pool and South pool progressed to the NACRA Championship final.

Round 2 - North

Round 2 - South

Round 3
The winning team from Round 2 - North played off against the winning team from Round 2 South for the championship.

USA South is the winner of the 2013 NACRA Rugby Championship. Matt Upton presumably won the MVP.

Related Page 
 NACRA Rugby Championship

External links 
 Details

References 

2013
2013 rugby union tournaments for national teams
2013 in North American rugby union
rugby union